Robert Hart Baker (born March 19, 1954) is a deaf symphonic and operatic conductor and music director based in York, Pennsylvania, United States. He has toured extensively in the U.S., Canada, and abroad. Among the many concerts he has led have been the full works of the Beethoven, Brahms, Rachmaninoff and Tchaikovsky symphonies and the Strauss tone poems, in addition to most of the orchestral works of Mahler, Dvorak, Schubert, Debussy, Ravel, Poulenc, and Ernest Bloch.

Artists with whom he has performed include pianists Joaquín Achúcarro, Alexander Peskanov, Valentina Igoshina and Christopher O'Riley; violinists Joshua Bell, Sarah Chang, Pamela Frank, Eugene Drucker, Ilya Kaler and Xiang Gao; violist Paul Neubauer; cellists Carter Brey, Yo-Yo Ma, David Finckel, Zuill Bailey and Paul Tobias; flutist James Galway; French hornist Richard Todd, trumpeter David Hickman, baritone Sherrill Milnes; soprano Angela Brown; bass-baritone Justino Diaz and many other acclaimed artists.

He has guest conducted at Radio City Music Hall and for the Spoleto U.S.A. and appeared at Carnegie Hall.

Baker won a 1977 Composition Award from the National Federation of Music Clubs, and ASCAP contemporary music programming awards with New York Youth Symphony in 1977 and the York (PA) Symphony Orchestra in 1986. The St. Louis Philharmonic under Baker's direction won a 2004 Telly Award for best classical local cable TV production. Baker has also performed as an oboist.

He has been involved in several community outreach programs usually sponsored by his various orchestras. He has served as visiting professor at the University of North Carolina-Asheville, Mars Hill College, Southern Illinois University Edwardsville, and the State University of New York. He has also been involved in outreach programs through the North Carolina School of the Arts, Penn State York, and the Logos Academy.

Education
Baker holds diplomas and degrees from the following institutions: Manhattan School of Music (preparatory division - NYC) ('69-'71), Academie Internationale d'ete (Nice, France) 1970, Mozarteum Conservatory (Salzburg, Austria) 1971, Horace Mann School (Riverdale, NY) 1971, Harvard University (A.B. cum laude - 1974), Yale University (M.Mus. '76, M.M.A '78, D.M.A '87), York College of Pennsylvania (Honorary Doctor of Humane Letters, 1999). He has studied conducting privately with Herbert von Karajan, Leonard Bernstein, Aaron Copland, James Yannatos, Arthur Weisberg, Henry Bloch, Johannes Somary, and Otto-Werner Mueller. He has also studied in master classes given by Lorin Maazel, Harold Farberman, Morton Gould, Maurice Abravanel, Jorge Mester, Sorghum Commissiona, and William Steinberg.

Orchestras
Baker is employed by a number of orchestras, but his primary work lies with the following:

 The Saint Louis Philharmonic (St. Louis, Missouri) as Conductor and Music Director. He has been with the Orchestra since 1982.
 The Asheville Lyric Opera (Asheville, North Carolina) as Principal Guest Conductor
 The Asheville Symphony Orchestra (Asheville, North Carolina) as Conductor Emeritus

He has previously held positions with:
 The Harrisburg Choral Society (Harrisburg, Pennsylvania)as Director. 
 The Asheville Symphony Orchestra as Conductor and Music Director (Asheville, NC: 1981-2004)
 The York Symphony Orchestra (York, Pennsylvania) as Conductor and Music Director. 
 The York Symphony Chorus and Chamber Society (York, Pennsylvania) as Director.
 The York Youth Symphony as Music Director and Conductor Laureate (York, Pennsylvania: 1987 -1999)
 The New York Youth Symphony at Carnegie Hall (New York, New York: 1977-1981)
 The Putnam (NY) Symphony Orchestra (1979–1981) as Conductor and Music Director
 The Danbury (CT) Little Symphony (1978–1981)
 The Connecticut Philharmonic Orchestra (1974–2001) as Founding Director and Conductor
 Bach Society Orchestra of Harvard University (1972–1974) as Conductor and Music Director
 The Bicentennial Festival Orchestra (1976) as conductor at Boston Symphony Hall
 The Harvard-Radcliffe Orchestra as principal oboe.

Guest conducting
In the United States
Baker has been a guest conductor for the Rhode Island Philharmonic Orchestra, Pennsylvania Centre Orchestra (State College, Pennsylvania), Roanoke Symphony Orchestra, and the South Carolina Philharmonic. He has also conducted at New York City's Radio City Music Hall and for orchestras in Montana, Arizona, Tennessee, Michigan, Illinois, and Pennsylvania.
Internationally
Baker has been guest conductor for the Busan Symphony Orchestra (Busan, South Korea), Orquestra do Norte (Porto, Portugal), Zurich Symphony Orchestra (Switzerland), Virtuoso Strings of Messina (Messina, Italy), Szeged Philharmonic Orchestra (Szeged, Hungary), Vratsa State Philharmonic Orchestra (Vratsa, Bulgaria), Orquesta Sinfónica del Estado de México (Mexico), and the Regina Symphony Orchestra (Canada). He has also conducted in Sabadell (Spain).
Opera and ballet
Asheville Lyric Opera - Carmen, La bohème, The Pirates of Penzance, La traviata, Madama Butterfly
Brevard Music Center (Brevard, North Carolina) - Carmen
Connecticut Opera - Madame Butterfly, Jujube's Dinner
Cullowhee Music Festival (Cullowhee, North Carolina) as Music Director and Conductor (1987–1989) - La traviata, Rigoletto, The Marriage of Figaro
Festival dei Due Mondi (Spoleto, Italy)  and Spoleto Festival USA as Assistant Conductor - worked on productions with Gian Carlo Menotti, Christian Badea, and Joseph Flufferfelt

Other projects

He has worked with composers Aaron Copland, Samuel Barber, Suzanne Bloch. He has given score readings and analysis. He worked with Richard Schulman of Asheville on Schulman's Camelot, and he is an acknowledged expert on the orchestral works of Horatio Parker (better known as teacher to Charles Ives) and on the music of Caryl Florio (aka William Robjohn), the English organist who became the in house composer at the famous Biltmore Estate. He also served as musical consultant to D. Elaine Calderin for two short stories from her book, Who Better to Play the Devil?.

Publications and recordings

 St. Louis Holiday Spectacular DVD (won national Telly award in 2004 for best classical local cable production)
 Kirkwood Children's Choral Holiday Video (finals of NBC's Clash of Choirs) and 2010 Holiday Pops Concert
 Stories of the Land - Along dutch Country Roads (Collaboration with colleague Stephen Gunzenhauser for the Lancaster-York Heritage Region DVD series - Baker conducted the film score itself.
 Arranged Nocturne for String Orchestra. Composed by Borodin. LP and CD. Vanguard Records
 Conductor Piano Concertos Composed by Liszt. Szeged Philharmonic, Hungary. CD. Aurefon Records.
 Conductor Brahms- Symphonies No.s 1 & 3, Mahler- Symphony No. 4, Dvorak- Symphony No.8, Strauss- Till Eulenspiegel, the works of Carl Florio, all with Asheville Symphony Orchestra. CD. Sonari Records
 Conductor Holst-The Planets, Wagner - Rienzi Overture, Ravel - Daphnis and Chloe Suite No. 2, all with the St. Louis Philharmonic. CD. Sonari Records
 Conductor Mendelssohn - Violin Concerto with David Perry and the Cullowhee Music Festival Orchestra. CD. Sonari Records.
 Conductor Liszt - Malediction, Strauss - Don Juan. all with Cullowhee Music Festival Orchestra. CD. CMF Label.
 Conductor Symphony in C-sharp minor St. Louis Philharmonic. LP only. Ernest Bloch Society records.

References

Further sources
 Robert Hart Baker's professional resume on Price Rubin Artists Management. Retrieved 22 December 2011.
 Baker's official biography on CHL Artists Management. Retrieved 22 December 2011.

21st-century conductors (music)
Living people
1954 births
Harvard University alumni
Musicians from York, Pennsylvania
Yale School of Music alumni
Pupils of Leonard Bernstein
Pupils of Aaron Copland
21st-century American musicians